is a Japanese snowboarder. He has represented Japan at the 2010 Winter Olympics in Vancouver.

References

1990 births
Snowboarders at the 2010 Winter Olympics
Living people
Olympic snowboarders of Japan
Japanese male snowboarders
Sportspeople from Sapporo
21st-century Japanese people